Patrick "Pat" Streeter Parker (October 16, 1929 – July 6, 2005) was an American businessman who served as chief executive officer of Parker Hannifin Corporation from 1971 to 1983, a member of the board of directors from 1960 to 1999, and chairman from 1977 to 1999.

Early life 
Born in Cleveland, Parker was the son of Arthur L. and Helen Parker. Arthur L. Parker founded the Parker Pneumatic Truck Brake company in 1918, which later evolved into the Parker Appliance Company.

Education 
Parker attended University School and later went to Williams College where he received his B.A. degree. He later received his M.B.A. degree from the Harvard Business School.

Business career 
At a company history presentation given in 1995 at the Euclid Avenue headquarters in Cleveland, Pat Parker said his father "dropped dead of a heart attack" in 1945 and left the entire business in the hands of his mother. "Many friends of the family advised her to sell but mom kept the business and later hired managers" to run it. Parker Appliance acquired the Hannifin Corporation in the late 1950s and for reasons of brand recognition renamed the business the Parker Hannifin Corporation. Throughout the period between World War II and his death, Pat Parker helped to build and expand Parker Hannifin to offer a wide array of hydraulic, pneumatic and electromechanical products, which gave Parker the position as a global leader in engineering. Now an $12.54 billion enterprise, the firm had annual sales of $197 million.

Most of Pat Parker's working career was with the company, starting from when he was a little boy. In 1960, Parker joined the board of directors of Parker Hannifin. He was elected president in 1968 and served as Chief Executive Officer from 1971 through 1983. He was named chairman in 1977, a position he retired from in 1999. He had previously retired as an employee in 1994.

He died from cancer at the age of 75 in July 2005.

Honors and awards 
He received many honors which include the International Executive of the Year, Certificate of Distinction for Executive Management, and he was inducted into the Hall of Fame for "Inside Business Magazine" in 2004.

References

External links

Williams College alumni
Harvard Business School alumni
20th-century American businesspeople
1929 births
2005 deaths